Guajratmitra is a leading daily newspaper of Surat and Gujarat in India. It is published from Surat, in Gujarati. It was founded in 1863 and is one of the oldest newspapers of India.

References

1853 establishments in India
Daily newspapers published in India
Newspapers published in Surat
Newspapers published in Gujarat
Gujarati-language newspapers published in India
Newspapers established in 1853
Mass media in Surat